Neodymium bromide may refer to:

 Neodymium(III) bromide (neodymium tribromide), NdBr3
 Neodymium(II) bromide (neodymium dibromide), NdBr2